The 23rd Academy Awards were held on March 29, 1951, honoring the films of 1950. All About Eve received a record 14 nominations, besting the previous record of 13 set by Gone with the Wind in 1939. It won six Oscars, including Best Picture, and earned director Joseph L. Mankiewicz his second consecutive Best Director award.

All About Eve was the second film, after Mrs. Miniver (1942), to receive five acting nominations. It was the first to receive multiple nominations in two acting categories, and the first (and, to date, only) film to receive four female acting nominations—two each for Best Actress and Best Supporting Actress. None was successful, losing to Judy Holliday in Born Yesterday and Josephine Hull in Harvey, respectively.

Sunset Blvd. was the fifth film with nominations in every acting category, and the second not to win any of them (after My Man Godfrey in 1936).

Awards

Nominations announced on February 12, 1951. Winners are listed first and highlighted in boldface.

Academy Honorary Awards
 George Murphy "for his services in interpreting the film industry to the country at large".
 Louis B. Mayer "for distinguished service to the motion picture industry".

Best Foreign Language Film
 The Walls of Malapaga (France/Italy)

Irving G. Thalberg Memorial Award
 Darryl F. Zanuck

Presenters
 Lex Barker and Arlene Dahl (Presenters: Best Art Direction)
 Charles Brackett (Presenter: Honorary Awards)
 Ralph Bunche (Presenter: Best Motion Picture)
 Ruth Chatterton (Presenter: Writing Awards)
 Broderick Crawford (Presenter: Best Actress)
 Marlene Dietrich (Presenter: Best Foreign Language Film)
 Coleen Gray (Presenter: Documentary Awards)
 Jane Greer (Presenter: Best Special Effects)
 Helen Hayes (Presenter: Best Actor)
 Dean Jagger (Presenter: Best Supporting Actress)
 Gene Kelly (Presenter: Music Awards)
 Phyllis Kirk (Presenter: Short Subject Awards)
 Mercedes McCambridge (Presenter: Best Supporting Actor)
 Leo McCarey (Presenter: Best Director)
 Marilyn Monroe (Presenter: Best Sound Recording)
 Debra Paget (Presenter: Best Film Editing)
 Debbie Reynolds (Presenter: Best Cinematography)
 Jan Sterling (Presenter: Best Costume Design)
 David Wayne (Presenter: Scientific & Technical Awards)

Performers
 Gloria DeHaven and Alan Young
 Frankie Laine ("Mule Train" from Singing Guns)
 Martin and Lewis ("Bibbidi-Bobbidi-Boo" from Cinderella)
 Lucille Norman

Multiple nominations and awards

These films had multiple nominations:
 14 nominations: All About Eve
 11 nominations: Sunset Blvd.
 5 nominations: Born Yesterday and Samson and Delilah
 4 nominations: Annie Get Your Gun and The Asphalt Jungle
 3 nominations:  Broken Arrow, Caged, Cinderella, Father of the Bride, King Solomon's Mines, and The Third Man
 2 nominations: Destination Moon, The Flame and the Arrow, Harvey, and The Magnificent Yankee

The following films received multiple awards.
 6 wins: All About Eve
 3 wins: Sunset Boulevard
 2 wins: King Solomon's Mines and Samson and Delilah

See also

 8th Golden Globe Awards
 1950 in film
 2nd Primetime Emmy Awards
 3rd Primetime Emmy Awards
 4th British Academy Film Awards
 5th Tony Awards

References

Academy Awards ceremonies
1950 film awards
1951 in American cinema
Academy Awards
March 1951 events in the United States